The Moșna is a left tributary of the river Târnava Mare in Romania. It discharges into the Târnava Mare in Mediaș. The Moșna Dam is constructed on this river.

References

Rivers of Romania
Rivers of Sibiu County